Nano Quest was the name of the 2006–07 challenge theme of FIRST Lego League. It revolved around the emerging field of nanotechnology.

Project
Teams were tasked with identifying an application of nanotechnology, see where current research stands and creatively improve upon it. Then teams shared their project with the community and with judges at competition.

Gameplay
The table performance portion of Nano Quest is played on a 4 ft by 8 ft field rimmed by wood boards. At competition, two of these fields are placed together to form an 8 ft square. In each -minute match, a team competes on each field with their robot to earn up to 400 points manipulating the mission models.

One of the mission models, the Space Elevator, straddles both fields in the center. This model earns points for both teams, no matter who triggered it.

The touch penalty objects are dirt particle models. They are worth up to 5 points each depending on their location on the field, but are removed from play every time the robot is touched outside of base.

Missions

All of the Nano Quest missions are related to nanotechnology and its applications:
 Individual Atom Manipulation - up to 40 points
 Smell (pizza molecules) - up to 15 points each
 Stain-Resistant Fabric - up to 30 points
 Dirt (particles) - up to 5 points each
 Atomic Force Microscopy - 40 points
 Self-Assembly - 30 points
 Smart Medicine - 50 points
 Nanotube Strength - up to 40 points
 Molecular Motor - 40 points
 Space Elevator - 40 points
 Fairness Bonus - 20 points

Notes

References

External links
 Nano Quest main page on the FLL website

FIRST Lego League games
2006 in robotics